Bibliothèque de Poche was a French television show discussing Literature. The show was created and presented by Michel Polac, it was broadcast from 1966 to 1970, on RTF.

References

External links

1966 French television series debuts
1970 French television series endings
1960s French television series